Naadi Aada Janme is a 1965 Indian Telugu-language drama film, produced by S. V. Ranga Rao under the banner Srivani Films and directed by A. C. Tirulokchandar. The film stars N. T. Rama Rao, Savitri and music composed by R. Sudarshanam. It is a remake of the Tamil film Naanum Oru Penn (1963), which in turn was an adaptation on the Bengali play Bodhu by Sri Shailash Dey. The film was a commercial success.

Plot 
Zamindar Vijaya Narasimha Rayalu (S. V. Ranga Rao) becomes mentally disturbed after the death of his wife Parvati and sticks to his room. He has two sons, Bhaskar (N. T. Rama Rao) and Chandram (Haranath). Bhaskar is an artist who dreams intensely regarding his future and wants to marry a beautiful educated girl. Zamindar's brother-in-law Dasaradharamaiah (Ramana Reddy), a cunning person freezes in their house and hangs around the property. Meanwhile, Zamindar wants to perform the alliance of Bhaskar and his ambition is also that the bride must resemble his wife. In the same town, there lives a small grocery vendor Simhadri (Allu Ramalingaiah) who has two sisters, the elder one Kalyani (Savitri) a dark complexion whereas the younger one Malathi (Jamuna) is elegant. Here Dasaradaramaiah makes a ploy by showing Malathi to Bhaskar and fixes the match with Kalyani. During the time of the wedding, the truth comes forward when everyone rebukes Kalyani. Now to protect her grace and his esteem Bhaskar marries Kalyani. Learning it, Zamindar becomes furious and does not allow the couple into the house, but on request of his loyal servant Ranganna (Perumallu), he soothes. Initially, the Zamindar & Bhaskar are reluctant towards Kalyani, but she gains their hearts through her good nature and also tends motherly affection towards Chandram. Eventually, Chandram & Malathi falls in love. Soon after, Kalyani becomes pregnant when Bhaskar awakens she is uneducated, he chides on her and she goes into a miscarriage. After that, Bhaskar leaves to Delhi for the national painting competitions. Now Kalyani firmly decides to study and requests Chandram to teach her at nights. Dasaradaramaiah exploits the situation by attributing an illicit relationship to them and makes Zamindar neck them out. In Delhi, Bhaskar gets acquaintance with his childhood friend Mohan (Jaggayya) in a drunken state, who reveals that his beautiful wife has ditched him. At that moment, Bhaskar realizes virtue is greater than beauty. After return, he learns the dilemma but gives no credence to it and leaves the house. Due to which Zamindar goes down when Dasaradaramaiah plans to transfer the property into his name, just in time, Kalyani arrives, breaks out his foul play and he flees when Zamindar senses the noble character of Kalyani. Finally, the movie ends on a happy note by the reunion of the family along with the marriage of Chandram & Malathi.

Cast 
Savitri as Kalyani
N. T. Rama Rao as Bhaskar
S. V. Ranga Rao as Zamindar Vijaya Narasimha Rayalu
Ramana Reddy as Dasaradharamaiah
Haranath as Chandram
Allu Ramalingaiah as Simhadri Appanna
Perumallu as Rangaiah
Jaggayya as Mohan (special appearance)
Jamuna as Malathi
Chaya Devi as Tayaramma
Surabhi Balasaraswathi as Seeta

Soundtrack 
Music composed by R. Sudarsanam. Lyrics were written by Daasarathi.

References

External links 

 

1960s Telugu-language films
1965 drama films
1965 films
Films based on adaptations
Films directed by A. C. Tirulokchandar
Indian black-and-white films
Indian drama films
Indian films based on plays
Telugu remakes of Tamil films
Films scored by R. Sudarsanam